Kickapoo may refer to:

People 
 Kickapoo people, a Native American nation
 Kickapoo language, spoken by that people
 Kickapoo Tribe of Kansas, a federally recognized tribe of Kickapoo people
 Kickapoo Tribe of Oklahoma, a federally recognized tribe of Kickapoo people
 Kickapoo Tribe of Texas, a federally recognized tribe of Kickapoo people
 Mexican Kickapoo, an indigenous people of Mexico

Places

United States 
 Kickapoo, Indiana
 Kickapoo, Kansas
 Kickapoo, Louisiana, DeSoto Parish, Louisiana
 Kickapoo State Recreation Area, Illinois
 Kickapoo, Wisconsin, a town
 Kickapoo Center, Wisconsin, an unincorporated community
 Kickapoo, Illinois
 Kickapoo Downtown Airport, a city-owned public-use airport located in Wichita County, Texas, United States
 Kickapoo High School:
 Kickapoo High School (Springfield, Missouri)
 Kickapoo High School (Viola, Wisconsin)
 Camp Kickapoo, a former Boy Scout Camp near Jackson, Mississippi
 Kickapoo Township (disambiguation)

Other uses 
 Kickapoo River in Wisconsin
 Lake Kickapoo in Archer County, Texas
 Kickapoo Cavern State Park, a park in Texas
 USS Kickapoo, the name of two ships in the U.S. Navy
 "Kickapoo", a song by Tenacious D on the soundtrack album The Pick of Destiny
 Kickapoo Joy Juice, a carbonated soft drink by Monarch Beverage Company distributed in South-East Asia
 Kickapoo Lucky Eagle Casino in Eagle Pass, Texas
 Old Kickapoo, a cannon used in Bleeding Kansas

See also 
 
 
 Kickapoo High School (disambiguation)

Language and nationality disambiguation pages